This is a complete list of members of the United States House of Representatives during the 34th United States Congress listed by seniority.
As an historical article, the districts and party affiliations listed reflect those during the 34th Congress (March 4, 1855 – March 3, 1857). Current seats and party affiliations on the List of current members of the United States House of Representatives by seniority will be different for certain members.

Seniority depends on the date on which members were sworn into office. Since many members are sworn in on the same day, subsequent ranking is based on previous congressional service of the individual and then by alphabetical order by the last name of the congressman.

Committee chairmanship in the House is often associated with seniority. However, party leadership is typically not associated with seniority.

Note: The "*" indicates that the representative/delegate may have served one or more non-consecutive terms while in the House of Representatives of the United States Congress.

U.S. House seniority list

Delegates

See also
34th United States Congress
List of United States congressional districts
List of United States senators in the 34th Congress by seniority

References

 United States Congressional Elections 1788-1997, by Michael J. Dubin (McFarland and Company 1998)

External links
Office of the Clerk of the United States House of Representatives

35